Hiroshi Sato (佐藤博, June 3, 1947 – October 27, 2012) was a Japanese singer-songwriter, born in Chiran, Kagoshima and raised in Kyoto. He was an influential keyboardist in the Japanese jazz fusion and soft rock scenes during the late 1970s and 1980s, later dubbed "city pop".

Early life and career 
Hiroshi was born as the eldest son of a temple in his home town of Chiran in the Kagoshima Prefecture, but moved to Kyoto in 1949 at the age of two.

During his high school years, Sato obtained a reel-to-reel tape recorder and began learning how to play the bass guitar and drums, recording his work in a garage. At age 20 he also began playing the piano, and later stated that "when I was 20 years old, I practiced so much that I was willing to give up the world if I didn't turn pro."

Around 1970, he started his career as a pianist in a jazz band in Osaka, eventually leading to his collaboration with other blues musicians such as the West Road Blues Band and Masaki Ueda, as well as folk musicians such as Kyozo Nishioka as part of "The Dylan", Masaji Otsuka and Ryo Kagawa.

In 1976, along with forming Shigeru Suzuki’s short-lived band Huckleback and collaborating with Haruomi Hosono and his friends from Tin Pan Alley, he released his first solo album "SUPER MARKET" through Nippon Columbia. He released 14 total albums up until his hiatus after "Oracle", which was released through Eastworld Records in 1996.

Discography

Albums

References 

Japanese singer-songwriters